Church of Santo Tomé may refer to:

Iglesia de Santo Tomé (Toledo), a church in Toldedo, Spain
Iglesia de Santo Tomé (Priandi), a church in Asturias, Spain